T. K. Kapali was an Indian politician and former Member of the Legislative Assembly of Tamil Nadu.

Political career 
He was elected to the Tamil Nadu legislative assembly from Mylapore constituency as a Dravida Munnetra Kazhagam candidate in 1977 election, and as an Anna Dravida Munnetra Kazhagam candidate in 1980 election. He defeated Nanjil K. Manoharan in 1980 election.

Death 
He died on 18 December 2007 when he was 78.  He has six sons and two daughters.

References 

Members of the Tamil Nadu Legislative Assembly
2007 deaths
Dravida Munnetra Kazhagam politicians
All India Anna Dravida Munnetra Kazhagam politicians
Year of birth missing